The 1992 NCAA Division I Men's Golf Championships were contested at the 54th annual NCAA-sanctioned golf tournament for determining the individual and team national champions of men's collegiate golf at the Division I level in the United States.

The tournament was held at the University of New Mexico Golf Course in Albuquerque, New Mexico.

Arizona won the team championship, the Wildcats' first NCAA title.

Future professional and six-time major winner Phil Mickelson, from Arizona State, won the individual title, his third of three.

Individual results

Individual champion
 Phil Mickelson, Arizona State (271)

Team results

Finalists

Eliminated after 36 holes

DC = Defending champions
Debut appearance

References

NCAA Men's Golf Championship
Golf in New Mexico
NCAA Golf Championship
NCAA Golf Championship
NCAA Golf Championship